is the French word for general. There are two main categories of generals: the general officers, which are the highest-ranking commanding officers in the armed forces, and the specialist officers with flag rank, which are high-level officers in the other uniformed services.

General officers

Army

History
The French army of the monarchy had several ranks of general officer:
  ("brigadier of the armies of the King"): a rank in a grey area of seniority, conferred on certain colonels who were in command of a brigade (cf. the grey area of the naval "commodore" rank given to certain captains, the equivalent of army full colonels, who had been in command of a group of ships and over the captains of the group's other ships). These officers wore a colonel's uniform with a star on the shoulder straps. This rank was abolished in 1788.
  ("field marshal"(major general)): the first substantive rank of general. The  wore a special uniform, blue and red, with a single bar of gold lace, and in the late 18th century also received two stars on the shoulder straps. The rank was redesignated Général de brigade in 1793 which retained the two star insignia. This explains why French generals' insignia starts with two stars.
 : an appointment conferred on a  who was commander-in-chief of a campaign.
 : not a military rank, but a dignity of the Crown.

The Third Republic of the 1880s reorganised the ranks of :
 , wearing two stars.
 , wearing three stars.

World War I
 , wearing three star and a holizontal bar above or below it. Considering the personnel balance with general officers of other countries during World War I. measures were taken to give commanders of an army corps and higher units the status and treatment corresponding to the Four-star rank. 　

Established in 1921
  (général commanding an army corps), an appointment conferred on certain , wearing four stars.
 Général membre du conseil supérieur de la guerre (general - member of the superior council of war, a body of the Ministry of War which had the functions of a general staff), wearing five stars. The experience of the First World War transformed the structure of the French Army.

Ranks as of 2013
In France, army generals are named after the type of unit they command.

Air force

Specialist officers

Armament
 
 
 
 

Maritime Administration
 
 

Military Administration
 
 
 

Military engineering
 
 
 

Notes

References

Military ranks of France